Hikayat Iskandar Zulkarnain is a Malay epic describing fictional exploits of Alexander the Great (Iskandar), identified with Dhu al-Qarnayn (Zulkarnain), a king briefly mentioned in the Quran. The oldest existing manuscript is dated 1713, but is in a poor state. Another manuscript was copied by Muhammad Cing Sa'idullah about 1830.

Iskandar Zulkarnain is claimed to be a direct antecedent of the Minangkabau kingdoms of Sumatra by their rulers. The best known Minangkabau ruler, Adityavarman, who ruled over Sumatra between 1347 and 1374 AD claimed for himself the name Maharajadiraja, 'a great lord of kings.' It was William Marsten who first publicized this link at the end of the 18th century. The descent from Iskandar Zulkarnain, is claimed via Raja Rajendra Chola (Raja Suran, Raja Chola) in the Malay Annals.

There is a "Sumatran version".

The most likely source of the Hikayat is the Arabic Sīrat al-Iskandar.

See also
 List of Hikayat
 Indonesian literature
 Alexander the Great in legend

Notes

Malay-language literature
Works about monarchs
Alexander the Great in legend
Dhul-Qarnayn